Andranomeva is a town and commune in Madagascar. It belongs to the district of Boriziny, which is a part of Sofia Region. The population of the commune was estimated at approximately 11,000 in the 2001 commune census.

Primary and junior level secondary education are available in town. About 90% of the population of the commune are farmers.  The most important crop is rice, while other important products are maize and cassava.  Fishing employs 10% of the population.

References and notes 

Populated places in Sofia Region